New York Stage and Film is an art and film institution founded in 1985 by Mark Linn-Baker, Max Mayer and Leslie Urdang in order to provide artists with a rigorous and nurturing environment to invigorate the artistic process; to promote collaboration between artistic peers and between artists and audiences; and to facilitate the sharing of knowledge from one artistic generation to the next. A non-profit company dedicated to both emerging and established artists in the development and production of theater and film, it is a vital incubator for artists and their work, a catalyst for stories that start with us and continue across the country and around the world.

Each year, in collaboration with Vassar College they produce the Powerhouse Season and Powerhouse Training Company. Year round work includes programming in New York City and the Hudson Valley, as well as a Filmmakers' Workshop. This work annually supports:

 400 professional artists
 40 professional projects
 75 student writers, directors, actors, and interns
 10,000 audience members

Johanna Pfaelzer was named NYSAF's first Artistic Director in 2007, having first worked with the company as Managing Producer in 1998, and later as a Producing Director. In 2019, Johanna stepped down from her post and handed the reins to Christopher Burney, NYSAF's second Artistic Director.

Dozens of notable works trace their developmental roots to NYSAF, including the 2016 Tony Award winners for Best Musical Hamilton (musical) and Best Play The Humans (play), as well as the Tony Award-winning plays Side Man and Doubt: A Parable, the Broadway musicals Hadestown, Head over Heels, American Idiot, Bright Star, and the 2017 Pulitzer finalists The Wolves and Taylor Mac's A 24-Decade History of Popular Music.

Awards

Founders award 
Recipients of the annual Founders' Award for Emerging Playwrights include:
 2010 Eric Bernat
 2011 Jonathan Caren
 2012 Don Nguyen
 2013 Sarah Gancher
 2014 Suzanne Heathcote
 2015 Harrison David Rivers
 2016 Max Vernon
 2017 Ngozi Anyanwu
 2018 Khat Knotahaiku
 2019 Keelay Gipson
 2020 Kirya Traber

References

External links 
 

1985 establishments in New York (state)